The Bush Mountains is a series of rugged elevations at the heads of the Ramsey and Kosco glaciers in Antarctica.

The Bush Mountains extend from Mount Weir in the west to Anderson Heights overlooking Shackleton Glacier in the east. They were photographed at a distance by the Byrd Antarctic Expedition (Byrd AE) on several flights to the Queen Maud Mountains in November 1929. The mountains were further defined from aerial photographs taken by the USAS (1939–41), US Navy Operation Highjump (1946–47), and USN Operation Deep Freeze (1956–63).

The Bush Mountains were named by US-SCAN, on the recommendation of Rear Admiral Byrd, after James I. Bush, American financier and patron of the Byrd AE, 1928–30.

Features
Geographical features include:

 Anderson Heights
 Kosco Glacier
 McIntyre Promontory
 Mincey Glacier
 Mount Boyd
 Mount Cromie
 Ramsey Glacier

References

Queen Maud Mountains
Dufek Coast